Petra Hammesfahr (born 10 May 1951) is a German crime writer. She has won several awards, including the Crime Prize of Wiesbaden and the Rhineland Literary Prize.

Hammesfahr was born in Immerath (Erkelenz), North Rhine-Westphalia. Her first novel was published in 1991, followed by more than a dozen more and significant popular success by the middle of that decade.

She published over 40 novels in German. Her novel The Sinner was published in English by Bitter Lemon Press in 2007 and again in 2017 in the United States by Penguin Books, translated from the original by John Brownjohn. The Sinner has been adapted for television by USA Network as an eight-episode limited series starring Jessica Biel and Bill Pullman, and premiered on 2 August 2017. Despite initially being a limited series, the show would be renewed for three more seasons, finally ending on December 1, 2021.

A second translated novel, The Lie, was published by Bitter Lemon Press in 2010.

Works

References

External links 
 Petra Hammesfahr bio – NRW Literatur im Netz 

1951 births
Living people
People from Düren (district)
German crime fiction writers
German women novelists
Women mystery writers
20th-century German novelists
20th-century German women writers
21st-century German novelists
21st-century German women writers